"Le Retour des Princes français à Paris" ("The return of the French Princes to Paris") was the de facto national anthem of France during the Bourbon Restoration. It used the melody of the then popular marching tune Vive Henri IV.

Lyrics

See also
Marche Henri IV
La Marseillaise

External links
 The anthem on youtube

References

Historical national anthems
French anthems
Bourbon Restoration